Cornflour may refer to:

 Cornflour (in the UK), corn starch, from the endosperm of the kernel of the corn (maize) grain
 Corn flour (in the US and elsewhere), very finely ground cornmeal, ground from dried maize

See also 
 Flour
 Starch
 Gluten
 Masa harina, a corn flour from the nixtamalization of maize
 Cornflower, a small annual flowering plant with blue flowers